Marienburg Stalag XXB or Stalag 20B Marienburg Danzig was a German prisoner-of-war camp in World War II.

Located near Marienburg (Malbork), it was originally a hutted and tented camp with a double boundary fence and watchtowers. British, Poles and Serbs were held here in 1940. An administration block including a hospital was erected in the latter part of 1940, mainly by prisoner labour. By 1941 a theatre had been built. POWs were sent out to labour in nearby farms, sawmills, factories, goodsyards and cutting ice on the river Nogat.

See also
List of German World War II POW camps

Bibliography
 Journey into captivity 1940, William Bampton. Printed privately.
 The March Towards Home, William Bampton. Printed privately.

External links
B24.net
The Last Escape - John Nichol, Tony Rennell - 2002 Penguin UK
 An account by Jack Durey of his service with 2nd Battalion Hampshire Regiment in France, his capture time at Stalag XX-B and his escape, and journey home via Odessa 

World War II prisoner of war camps in Germany
World War II sites in Poland
History of Serbia